John Morehead is the name of:

John H. Morehead (1861–1942), Governor of Nebraska
John Motley Morehead (1796–1866), Governor of North Carolina
John Motley Morehead II (1866–1923), U.S. Representative from North Carolina
John Motley Morehead III (1870–1965), chemist, U.S. ambassador to Sweden, and noted philanthropist